"The Passion of the Betty" is tenth episode of the fourth season of the American comedy-drama series, Ugly Betty, and the 75th episode overall. It originally aired on ABC in the United States on January 6, 2010.

Plot
When Betty becomes concerned that she and Matt are spending too much time together, she tries to give him something else to be passionate about – a surprise gallery showing of his art work – with unintended results. Meanwhile, Marc is horrified that his one-night stand, Troy, is falling for him, since Marc was Troy's "first", Hilda grapples with whether or not to tell Bobby that he's the father of her unborn child, and Cal officially replaces Wilhelmina with Denise.

Production
This was the first episode in the series to air on Wednesday, as ABC announced on December 1, 2009 that it was moving Ugly Betty to Wednesday nights starting on January 6, 2010.

Reception
Tanner Stransky of Entertainment Weekly called "The Passion of the Betty" "yet another fantastic episode...full of "hilarious one-liners".

Ratings
The move to Wednesday gave the show another resurgence, as it posted a 3.5/6 overall with 5.1 million viewers tuning in, an increase from the previous episode.

References

Ugly Betty (season 4) episodes
2010 American television episodes
Television episodes directed by S. J. Clarkson